The following is a list of Sites of Special Scientific Interest in the Mid Argyll and Cowal Area of Search. For other areas, see List of SSSIs by Area of Search.

 Ardchyline Wood
 Ardpatrick and Dunmore Woods
 Artilligan and Abhain Srathain Burns
 Beinn an Lochain
 Ben Lui
 Central Lochs Bute
 Craighoyle Woodland
 Craignure Mine
 Ellary Woods
 Garabal Hill
 Glen Loin
 Glen Ralloch To Baravalla Woods
 Glendaruel Wood and Crags
 Hells Glen
 Inverneil Burn
 Kilberry Coast
 Knapdale Lochs
 Knapdale Woods
 Linne Mhuirich
 Loch Eck
 Moine Mhor
 North End of Bute
 Ruel Estuary
 Strone Point, North Loch Fyne
 Taynish Woods
 Tayvallich Juniper and Fen
 Ulva, Danna and The McCormaig Isles
 West Tayvallich Peninsula

 
Mid Argyll and Cowal